Luna Luna was an open-air museum and amusement park in Hamburg, Germany from June 4 to August 31, 1987. Curated by Austrian artist André Heller, it was an attempt to "create a travelling terrain of modern art, than in centuries-old principal of the fairground." Heller commissioned various artists to design attractions for this event. The participating artists included Jean-Michel Basquiat, Keith Haring, Roy Lichtenstein, Salvador Dalí, David Hockney, Kenny Scharf, Roland Toper, Jean Tiguely, and Sonia Delaunay.

As of November 2022, the original Luna Luna works are being restored and new works being commissioned for a global tour funded by DreamCrew.

History 
In the mid-1980s, André Heller began to recruit artists for his project Luna Luna, an amusement park designed by the "most important artists of the period." Heller received a $500,000 grant from the German magazine Neue Revue. Heller turned down an offer from McDonald's to buy into the project, saying "we don't want to set up a Disneyland." He collaborated with 32 artists for a project that was described by Life magazine as the "most dizzying, dazzling art show on Earth." Heller paid the artists $10,000 each, stating that the reason why all those renowned artists participated for so little money was because he told them: "Listen, you are constantly getting the greatest commissions, everyone wants your paintings or sculptures, but I am inviting you to take a trip back to your own childhood. You can design your very own amusement park, just as you think would be right today, and really without exception everyone answered by saying, sure, that's a nice pleasant challenge."

While some of the artists traveled to Germany for the project, others sent their designs to Vienna, where a specialist team of technicians and theater painters, carpenters and architects carried out the work. There were around 30 attractions, which included a walk-in "shadow room" by Georg Baselitz, a musical "enchanted tree" by David Hockney, and boldly colored glass labyrinth by Roy Lichtenstein. Keith Haring designed a carousel, with the seats in the shape of cartoon characters, and painted the whole thing with his icons and symbols. Jean-Michel Basquiat designed a Ferris wheel composed of his various drawings, which prominently featured the rear-end of a baboon. Kenny Scharf created six comic sculptures and painted more than 100 individual pictures in a Viennese workshop, which were mounted around a brightly colored swing carousel. Other attractions included a Sonia Delaunay-designed entrance gate, Salvador Dalí's "reflective pavilion" and a hand painted circus wagon by August Walla. Each attraction had its own individual music. Philip Glass composed the music for Lichtenstein's glass labyrinth. Karajan recorded a CD with the Berlin Philharmonic for Hockney's room. Basquiat chose the album Tutu by Miles Davis.

As a tribute to Joseph Beuys, who died in January 1986, Heller had a manifesto drawn up that the artist had authorized a few years prior. Heller also contributed some works. In addition to the "wedding pavilion" and a "head-through-the-wall booth," he had a blue-red "dream station" built as a coffee house. Reportedly, Andy Warhol also wanted to take part, but other American artists objected. Warhol, who died in February 1987, was memorialized with a booth where visitors were allowed—based on Warhol's credo 15 minutes of fame—to be photographed next to life-size pictures of Albert Einstein, Marilyn Monroe or Marlene Dietrich.

In 1987, Heller released book Luna Luna, published by Wilhelm Heyne Verlag in Munich, which features all of the attractions. For the book cover, Heller asked the participating artists to draw a moon and add a sentence they found fitting.

Luna Luna was only displayed once at the Moorweide in Hamburg from June 4 to August 31, 1987. The entry fee was 20 Deutsche Marks (children free on weekdays). The exhibition had been expected to travel to the Netherlands later in 1987 and then the United States in 1988. In 1991, it was reported that Luna Luna, described as an outdoor contemporary art museum, would be temporarily installed at Balboa Park's Inspiration Point in San Diego, California. It was scheduled to be in San Diego for 18 months as a gift from the Stephen and Mary Birch Foundation, based in Wilmington, Delaware. Ensuing litigation due to a claimed breach of contract prevented Luna Luna from being exhibited.

In 2022, it was reported that Luna Luna is being revived for a global tour with production assistance from Live Nation.

References

Further reading 

 
 Heller, André (1987). Luna Luna - ermöglicht von Neue Revue. Photography by Sabina Sarnitz, Essay by Hilde Spiel. Heyne Verlag, Munich. 

1987 in art
Art exhibitions in Germany
Defunct amusement parks
Defunct amusement parks in Germany
Contemporary art exhibitions